Bahshillo Fatullayev() (born 15 September 1964) is an Uzbek television and cinema actor.

Bahshillo Fatullayev began his career in the arts in 1989. Fatullayev made his feature film debut in 2012 in Faryod, and has appeared in many TV series and films since then

Biography 
Fatullayev Bahshillo Ismatovich was born on September 15, 1964, in the city of Bukhara. After graduating from high school in 1981, he entered the Tashkent Institute of Art and Theater. After graduating from the institute in 1986, he continues his work in the field of art.

Career 
From 1986 to 1989, Bakhshillo Fatullayev worked as the head of the cultural center of Bukhara region. In 2012, he became the father of Said Mukhtorov's film "Faryod". In 2014, her role in "Tears" did not bring her much luck. In 2015, his role in the film "Twin Lovers", in 2016, Farhod and Shirin brought him great success. Producer Ruslan Mirzayev played a role in the film Istanbul billionaire, which brought him success.  With the negative protagonist in the film "Panjara", he showed to the public that he is a versatile actor. He starred in Rustam Sadiyev's "Ota Rozi". The series "Battle of Hearts" and "Games of Love", co-produced with Turkey, brought him real fame. In 2021, he appeared in a military role in the film Operation Mercy. Currently, the films awaiting the premiere are directed by Rustam Sadiev, Baron 2  and Producer by Ruslan Mirzayev, Yur Muhabbat.

Education 

 1970-1981  a student of the 272 nd comprehensive school of Bukhara district of Bukhara Region.
 1982-1986 a student of the  Uzbekistan State Institute of Arts and Culture

Filmography 
Below is a chronologically ordered list of films in which Bahshillo Fatullayev has appeared.

Series

References

External links 

 

1964 births
Living people
Uzbeks
Uzbekistani male film actors
21st-century Uzbekistani male actors